Ekkapan Suratsawang (Thai เอกพันธ์ สุรัตน์สว่าง), is a Thai futsal Striker, and currently a member of Thailand national futsal team.

He competed for Thailand at the 2008 FIFA Futsal World Cup finals in Brazil.

References

Ekkapan Suratsawang
1986 births
Living people
Ekkapan Suratsawang
Southeast Asian Games medalists in futsal
Competitors at the 2007 Southeast Asian Games